DeValls Bluff is a city in and the county seat of the southern district of Prairie County, Arkansas, United States.  The population was 619 at the 2010 census.

History

Prairie County has always been important to Arkansas for the transportation of people and goods throughout the state. Initially, it was the White River that gave the agricultural county its importance for transport, since waterways were the primary means of long-distance transportation in the period before the development of railroads. Prairie County was cut from Arkansas, Pulaski, Monroe, St. Francis, and White counties in 1846 and included present-day Lonoke County. European settlement in Prairie County came in the 19th century, with Jacob M. DeVall and his son, Chappel, becoming the first recorded settlers around DeValls Bluff according to 1851 tax records.

During the Civil War, the city was a trading center on the White River, which continued to be the primary shipping corridor when the Arkansas River was innavigable. A railroad connection between North Little Rock and DeValls Bluff gave the city further strategic importance. Union forces traveling up the White from Arkansas Post under the command of Brigadier General Willis Gorman captured DeValls Bluff on January 18, 1863. However, the Union forces eventually returned to Arkansas Post, and the city returned to Confederate control. Following the capture of Little Rock, Union cavalry led by Brigadier General John Wynn Davidson joined with gunboats under the command of Lieutenant George Bache in Clarendon on August 9, 1863 and traveled up the White River to capture DeValls Bluff. Major General Frederick Steele proceeded to DeValls Bluff from Helena, and the city was used to house supplies and injured Union soldiers for the remainder of the war.

Geography

DeValls Bluff is located at  (34.784760, -91.460346). The city is located within the Grand Prairie section of Prairie County, a subdivision of the Mississippi embayment within the Mississippi Alluvial Plain. Historically, the Grand Prairie was a flat grassland between the Arkansas River and the White River. However, the area was subject to clear cutting for row agriculture by early settlers. Today, the area is defined by rice cultivation, aquaculture and duck hunting.

According to the United States Census Bureau, the town has a total area of 2.8 km2 (1.1 mi2), of which 2.7 km2 (1.0 mi2) is land and 0.2 km2 (0.1 mi2) (6.42%) is water.

Demographics

As of the census of 2000, there were 783 people, 334 households, and 218 families residing in the town.  The population density was 293.5/km2 (762.8/mi2).  There were 389 housing units at an average density of 145.8/km2 (379.0/mi2).  The racial makeup of the town was 67.82% White, 31.80% Black or African American, 0.13% Asian, and 0.26% from two or more races.  0.13% of the population were Hispanic or Latino of any race.

There were 334 households, out of which 33.2% had children under the age of 18 living with them, 43.7% were married couples living together, 17.4% had a female householder with no husband present, and 34.7% were non-families. 31.7% of all households were made up of individuals, and 17.1% had someone living alone who was 65 years of age or older.  The average household size was 2.34 and the average family size was 2.96.

In the town the population was spread out, with 28.6% under the age of 18, 6.8% from 18 to 24, 25.5% from 25 to 44, 20.9% from 45 to 64, and 18.1% who were 65 years of age or older.  The median age was 38 years. For every 100 females, there were 79.6 males.  For every 100 females age 18 and over, there were 77.5 males.

The median income for a household in the town was $21,534, and the median income for a family was $32,708. Males had a median income of $28,088 versus $16,771 for females. The per capita income for the town was $13,582.  About 18.4% of families and 23.6% of the population were below the poverty line, including 28.7% of those under age 18 and 22.1% of those age 65 or over.

Education
Hazen School District is the area school district, and operates Hazen High School.

The DeValls Bluff School District consolidated into the Hazen district on July 1, 2006.

References

External links
Encyclopedia of Arkansas History & Culture entry

Cities in Arkansas
Cities in Prairie County, Arkansas
County seats in Arkansas